Lucy Whipp (born 12 November 1995) is an English footballer who plays as a midfielder for Women's Championship club Coventry United.

Club career

Everton
Whipp joined the Everton academy aged 12. She was promoted to the first team in 2013, playing two seasons in the FA WSL before the team was relegated at the end of the 2014 season. On 1 June 2014, Whipp was part of the Everton squad that played in the FA Cup final, appearing as a 71st minute substitute in a 2–0 defeat to Arsenal.

St. John's Red Storm
In 2015, Whipp moved to the United States in order to combine her football career with pursuing higher education, enrolling at St. John's University in New York City. She spent four seasons playing college soccer for NCAA Division I team St. John's Red Storm in the Big East Conference and was named to the conference All-Rookie Team in her first year.

Birmingham City
Whipp returned to England after graduating in summer 2019, signing with FA WSL club Birmingham City. On 8 September 2019, Whipp made her Birmingham debut starting in the season opener, a 1–0 loss to former-club Everton. Whipp scored her first goal for the club on 8 December 2019, opening the scoring in a 2–0 win over Bristol City.

Coventry United
In January 2023, Whipp joined Women's Championship club Coventry United.

Career statistics

Club
.

References

External links
 Profile at Birmingham City
 Profile at St. John's Red Storm
 

1995 births
Living people
English women's footballers
Women's Super League players
Everton F.C. (women) players
Birmingham City W.F.C. players
Coventry United W.F.C. players
St. John's Red Storm women's soccer players
Women's association football forwards
England women's youth international footballers